Robina Williams is an English author.

Biography
Williams was born in a small village in Cheshire. She lives in Liverpool. She has an Honours degree in Modern Languages from Oxford University and a Master of Philosophy research degree in English literature from Liverpool University. Her research thesis was on the links between Wilkie Collins and nineteenth-century art. She enjoys looking at paintings and the plot of Jerome and the Seraph is arranged around a painting by Sir John Roddam Spencer Stanhope called "Thoughts of the Past".

Williams has been a schoolteacher, college lecturer, journalist and secretary.

Works

Fiction
Jerome and the Seraph (2004)
Angelos (2006)

External links
Author website
Author interview

Living people
21st-century English novelists
English women novelists
21st-century English women
Year of birth missing (living people)